Abu al Abyad (formerly Abu al Jirab) is the largest of about 200 islands along the coast of the United Arab Emirates. It is situated in the emirate of Abu Dhabi. Settlements on the island include Al Jirab, Bū Līfīyāt, and Jazirah.

The eastern section of the island is called Al Jirab, while the western section is called Muqaysiţ, and the westernmost point of the island is known as Ra's Muqay.

References 

Islands of the Emirate of Abu Dhabi
Central Region, Abu Dhabi